Felicia Gallant is a fictional character on the NBC soap opera Another World, played by Linda Dano. The character debuted on the episode broadcast January 6, 1983, and stayed until the show's final episode on June 25, 1999. Dano won a Daytime Emmy award for her portrayal of Felicia in 1993.

Casting
Actress Anna Stuart auditioned for this part but lost the role to Dano.  Producers were so impressed by her audition that they created for her the role of Donna Love.

Character development
The character of Felicia is a professional romance novelist who lives in Bay City. The character was modeled after real-life romance novelist Jacqueline Susann.  Head-writer Robert Soderbergh had been friends with Susann before her death in the 1970s and regularly spoke at length with Linda Dano about Susann's passion for living.

Her character was brought on to bring an element of glamour to the ailing show. She was widely embraced by the fans immediately and became a beloved character on the soap until its end in 1999.

Storylines
Felicia was introduced as a glamorous romance novelist, who wrote for Cory Publishing (Dano wrote romance novels that were published under her character's name). Felicia had affairs with Cass Winthrop, who later became her best friend, and Carl Hutchins. She married Louis St. George, Zane Lindquist, Mitch Blake, Lucas Castigliano, and Sergei Radzinsky. Lucas was, out of all the men she married, the true love of her life. When Lucas came to town, he came looking for the daughter he knew was alive, but she thought was stillborn (Felicia and Lucas had been lovers when they were teenagers). By extension, he revealed that she was born Fanny Grady and from a tempestuous family background. Since Felicia had taken a long time to build up this wealthy and glamorous reputation, it embarrassed her horribly to have other people know her business.

Over time, her marriage to Mitch hit a rough patch, and each cheated on the other. They both accepted their marriage was over and they had a mutual, amicable divorce. With Lucas back in her life, she fell for him all over again, and they were married. However, Lucas was shot by a jealous ex-lover and died in hospital weeks later, leaving Felicia heartbroken.

However, by this time, Felicia had found her daughter, the nasty vixen Lorna Devon (Alicia Coppola). Felicia and Lorna were adversaries for a very long time, but eventually warmed to a mother-daughter relationship. Lorna also made enemies with Felicia's adopted daughter, Jenna; one memorable stunt involved Lorna replacing Jenna's boyfriend's music video with a never-before-seen porn tape with Jenna as the centerpiece, mere seconds before it was to air live on Felicia's talk show.

A later romantic interest for Felicia was John Hudson, as he was having troubles with his marriage to wife Sharlene. Her final marriage was to Sergei Radzinsky, whom she married to keep him in the country; he was receiving treatments for aplastic anemia as a result of exposure to Chernobyl.

Novels by Felicia Gallant
Felicia has published at least 53 books, all gothic romance, except as noted.

 Beyond Paradise
 The Bride of Bombay
 The Bride of Waverly
 The Cannons of Newcastle
 Castle of Desire
 Damned by Desire
 The Daring Heart
 Doctor's Desire
 Driven to Passion
 Ebony Heartbeat
 Embers in the Snow (1985)
 Endless Journey
 Every Heart Knows
 Fallen Females
 Flames in the Night
 Forbidden Flower (1994, rejected)
 Forbidden Passion
 For the Love of Poppy
 Gardenias for Gwendolyn
 Gone with the Dawn (1983, first for Cory Publishing)
 Handmaiden's Heart
 The Heart That Heals (1996, contemporary)
 The Heart's Own Music
 Into the Fire (1994, semi-autobiographical)
 The Lady and the Laborer (1989)
 Liza

 Lock Out the Night
 Lonely and Unloved
 Love Beneath the Stars
 Love on the Moors
 Lust in the Kremlin (1980s)
 The Manly Heart
 The Mistress of Orleans
 Moonlight Desires (1983)
 My Finest Hour
 Paradise Delayed (1998)
 Passion's Progress (1983)
 The Pauper's Ransom
 The Rebel Princess
 Rive Gauche Serenade
 Rocky Mountain Miracle
 Sands of the Desert
 Sands of the Heart
 Savage Love (1983)
 Shimmering Love
 Sweet Captive
 Torrid Tundra Nights
 Untold Secrets
 Walking in the Light: The Story of Frankie Frame Winthrop (1997, biographical)
 White Snow in Hell
 Windblown Rose

External links
  (official)
Felicia Gallant character profile at SoapCentral.com
 WorldCat search: author Felicia Gallant – the first three hits are Dreamweaver in English, Japanese, and Italian-language editions

Another World (TV series) characters
Television characters introduced in 1983
Fictional writers
Female characters in television